Jef Johnson is an American clown, philosopher, and drama teacher. He is best known for his investigation into the concept of "state of clown" and "the emerging game." Johnson was a principal artist in the Broadway and International touring company of Slava's Snowshow and has worked with Cirque du Soleil as a workshop director, clown-animator and special artistic consultant. Founder of Jef Johnson's Clown Lab in New York City, and master faculty at The Nouveau Clown Institute (NCI) in Europe, the International Clown School in Portugal and L'Auguste Studio in Montreal, Canada. His solo works include Open Space, Azar, Sótão, Sogno A Lume Di Candela, Sogno Al Silenzio Del Piano, Pinche Show, Sencillo, White Noise.

References

External links

A Fool's Idea

American male stage actors
American clowns
American male film actors
American acting theorists
American theatre directors
American male writers
Cirque du Soleil performers
American mimes
Living people
1968 births